For the 1996 Tour de France, the 18 teams on top of the UCI rankings at the start of 1996 were automatically invited for the Tour. These were:

Four wildcards were given, for a total of 22 teams:

Teams

Qualified teams

Roslotto–ZG Mobili

Invited teams

Cyclists

By starting number

By team

By nationality

References

1996 Tour de France
1996